The yellow-eyed bristlebill (Bleda ugandae) is a species of songbird in the bulbul family, Pycnonotidae. It is found in central Africa.

References

yellow-eyed bristlebill
Birds of Central Africa
yellow-eyed bristlebill